The Ambassador of the Kingdom of Serbia to the Khedivate of Egypt was the Kingdom of Serbia's foremost diplomatic representative to the Khedivate of Egypt. Known as Ambassador Extraordinary and Plenipotentiary, the office holder was Head of the Kingdom of Serbia's diplomatic mission. The Khedivate of Egypt was an autonomous tributary state of the Ottoman Empire under British dominance. The position ended with the abolishment of the Khedivate on 5 November 1914.

Serbian ambassadors to Egypt

References

Kingdom of Serbia
Egypt
Serbia diplomacy-related lists